INS Kumbhir is the lead vessel of her class of the amphibious warfare ships of the Indian Navy.

History
Built at the Gdańsk Shipyard in Poland, INS Kumbhir was commissioned in November 1986.

References

Kumbhir-class tank landing ships
1986 ships